Paul Gilbert (born Ed MacMahon; December 27, 1918 – February 13, 1976) was an American film and television actor.

Biography
Gilbert's family were vaudeville performers, and he began his career as an aerialist until he had a fall. He continued performing music, dancing and comedy.

He starred in the 1954 series The Duke as a former boxer who has decided to give up his fighting career to become a respectable nightclub owner. In the pilot episode, Gilbert sings, dances, juggles and plays four instruments in the band.

Gilbert played various roles and performed on numerous shows including The Spike Jones Show in 1954. He played the role of murder victim Harrison Boring in the 1964 Perry Mason episode "The Case of the Blonde Bonanza." Gilbert also appeared in other early television shows such as The NBC Comedy Hour, The Colgate Comedy Hour and Lux Video Theatre.

In the 1960s, Gilbert was seen on several network television series including The Dick Van Dyke Show, The Hollywood Palace, Gomer Pyle U.S.M.C., Good Morning World and The Dean Martin Show. An accomplished juggler, Gilbert appeared on Rowan and Martin's Laugh-In as a French juggler.

On May 9, 1964 (the day after her birth), Gilbert and his wife Barbara Crane adopted Melissa Gilbert, who played Laura Ingalls Wilder, and her brother Jonathan Gilbert, who played Willie Oleson, on the NBC TV series Little House on the Prairie.

Death
Gilbert was believed to have died suddenly of a stroke on February 13, 1976. In her autobiography, Melissa Gilbert wrote that because of suffering caused by constant pain stemming from World War II injuries, he died by suicide.

Actress and producer Sara Gilbert (born Sara Rebecca Abeles), the daughter of Paul Gilbert's wife Barbara and her second husband, Harold Abeles, took the Gilbert surname in 1984 although she had no blood or legal ties to Paul Gilbert.

Filmography

References

External links
  

1918 births
1976 deaths
Male actors from New York City
American male film actors
American male television actors
Burials at Forest Lawn Memorial Park (Hollywood Hills)
20th-century American male actors
Suicides in California
American military personnel of World War II
1976 suicides